"Maschine brennt" is a song by Falco from his 1982 debut studio album Einzelhaft. The song was also released as a single.

Background and writing 
The song was written by Robert Ponger and Falco. The recording was produced by Robert Ponger.

Commercial performance 
The song reached no. 4 in Austria and no. 10 in Germany.

Track listings 
7" single GIG 111 127 (1982, Austria, Switzerland)
7" single GIG 6.13555 AC (1982, Germany)
7" single A&M AMS 9236 (1982, Netherlands, Spain)
7" single GIG GIG-127 (1982, Finland)
 "Maschine brennt" (3:36)
 "Ganz Wien" (5:08)

12" maxi single "On the Run" A&M SP-12063 (1982, US)
 A. "On The Run (Auf der Flucht)" (Specially Remixed Version) (4:33)
 B. "Maschine Brennt" (Specially Remixed Version) (4:55)

Charts

References

External links 
 Falco – "Maschine brennt" at Discogs
 Falco – "On the Run (Auf der Flucht)" at Discogs

1982 songs
1982 singles
Falco (musician) songs
Songs written by Falco (musician)
Songs written by Robert Ponger